Political Life :
N. S. N. Nataraj is an Indian politician and was member of the Tamil Nadu Legislative Assembly from the Kangayam constituency in Fourteenth Assembly of Tamil Nadu from 2011-2016. He represents the Anna Dravida Munnetra Kazhagam party.

Business :
He is a prominent businessman in the field of coconut oil. He is the pioneer in building Kangayam as a manufacturing hub in copra and coconut oil. His brand "NSN" Coconut oil is one of the leading brands in market"

Personal Life :
He has one Wife named Shanthi, Son Dhanapal and Daughter Premalatha is a resident of Kangayam

References 

Members of the Tamil Nadu Legislative Assembly
All India Anna Dravida Munnetra Kazhagam politicians
Living people
Year of birth missing (living people)